Radio 1 Sessions is a compilation of studio recordings made for BBC Radio One by the pop punk band Generation X between 1977 and 1979. Three separate John Peel sessions are featured, along with a cover version of Johnny Kidd and the Pirates "Shakin' All Over", recorded for David Jensen's early evening show.

Track listing

Radio 1 Sessions

Notes
Tracks 1 − 4 recorded 12 April 1977 for John Peel.
Tracks 5 − 8 recorded 12July 1977 for John Peel.
Track 9 recorded 12 June 1978 for David Jensen  - "King Rocker" and "One Hundred Punks" were also recorded, but they no longer exist in the BBC vault.
Tracks 10 − 13 recorded 15 January 1979 for John Peel.

Personnel
Generation X
 Billy Idol − vocals
 Tony James − bass guitar
 Bob "Derwood" Andrews − guitar
 Mark Laff − drums
 John Towe − drums for tracks 1 − 4

References 

Generation X (band) albums
Generation X
2002 live albums
2002 compilation albums
BBC Radio recordings